Mine Circuit (みねサーキット) was a  motor racing circuit in Nagao, Nishiatsu-cho, Mine, Yamaguchi Prefecture, Japan. It used to be known as Nishinihon. The track closed in February 2006.

It was one of the main circuits in Japanese motorsport; until 2005, every year, one or more races of the most important national categories, (the Japan GT Championship and Formula Nippon series) were held at this circuit.

Lap records

The official fastest race lap records at the Mine Circuit are listed as:

See also
Mazda Proving Grounds

References

Road test tracks by manufacturer
Defunct motorsport venues
Motorsport venues in Japan